Aleksandra Palagacheva (born 2 September 2002) is a Bulgarian footballer who plays as a defender for Women's National Championship club PFC Lokomotiv Plovdiv and the Bulgaria women's national team.

Club career
Palagacheva has played for Lokomotiv Plovdiv in Bulgaria.

International career
Palagacheva represented Bulgaria at the 2019 UEFA Women's Under-17 Championship and two UEFA Women's Under-19 Championship qualifications (2019 and 2020). She made her senior debut on 20 September 2020 in a 3–0 friendly win over Luxembourg.

References

2002 births
Living people
Bulgarian women's footballers
Women's association football defenders
Bulgaria women's international footballers